Adesh is a masculine given name. Notable people with the name include:

 Adesh Kanwarjit Singh Brar (1949–2012), Indian politician and farmer
 Adesh Chauhan, Indian politician
 Adesh Gupta (born 1969), Indian politician
 Adesh Pratap Singh Kairon, Indian politician
 Adesh Samaroo, Trinidad and Tobago musician
 Aadesh Shrivastava (1964–2015), Indian composer

Indian masculine given names
Nepalese masculine given names